Gods Lake Airport  is located  east of Gods Lake, Manitoba, Canada.

References

Registered aerodromes in Manitoba